Laevipilina antarctica is a species of monoplacophoran, a superficially limpet-like marine mollusk. It is found in the Weddell Sea and the Lazarev Sea of Antarctica.

Evolution
In 2006, a molecular study on Laevipilina antarctica suggested that extant Monoplacophora and Polyplacophora form a well-supported clade with the researched Neopilina closest to the chitons. The two classes in this new clade, with the proposed name Serialia, all show a variable number of serially repeated gills and eight sets of dorsoventral pedal retractor muscles.

References

Monoplacophora
Molluscs described in 1992